Belait CSS-2 is an Accommodation platform operated by Belait Shipping Company co. Sdn Bhd. currently work for Brunei Shell Petroleum.She can provide a place for accommodation, Lifting, maintenance, rescue and hoist. She has a sister ship named Belait CSS-1 which is commissioned years longer than CSS-2 which makes CSS-2 the newest one.

Construction and career 
Construction of Belait CSS-2 was cooperated between Belait Shipping and Qess and China for construction of oil and gas vessels. Belait CSS-2 was primarily built as a well-intervention vessel to support production of oil in Brunei. Each ship cost about 526 million yuan ($80 million). She’s built in Fujian, China and registered in Majuro, Marshall Islands.

Belait CSS-2 was delivered to Brunei on 2 September 2019. She regularly travel to Champion Field which is a complex oil and gas field, situated 40 kilometres north-northwest of Bandar Seri Begawan, in water depths of 10 to 45 metres. She usually docked in Muara Port, Brunei after every voyages back.

Equipments 
The purpose of the CSS is a multi-function well-intervention, supply and light construction vessel. The primary features a 150 T lattice boom crane, a telescopic heave compensated gangway, a moonpool, a 12.8 T rated helideck, DP-2 rating and accommodation up to 200 people. 

She is designed by Vard Marine. The design of the CSS is a cost-effective, stable platform with most of the capabilities of much larger vessels at a far lower cost. In addition, they wanted a design that could be built at shipyards around the world.

Gallery

References 

Ships of Brunei
Ships of the Marshall Islands
Ships built in China
2000s ships
Diesel engines
Diesel engine technology
Brunei–China relations